The Ministry of Health (MOH) is a government ministry of Rwanda, headquartered in Kigali. As of 4 October 2016, Diane Gashumba is the minister, replacing Agnes Binagwaho, who served from 2011 to 2016.

References

External links

Ministry of Health

Health
Health in Rwanda
Rwanda